Oroide is copper and zinc, or copper and tin, often employed inexpensively for decorative purposes where a gold-colored metal is desirable.

Oroide may refer to:

 Brass, an alloy of copper and zinc that has a bright gold-like appearance
 Bronze, an alloy of copper and (in modern times) tin
 Other gold-colored copper alloys

See also 
 Iron pyrite, a non-oroide mineral sometimes referred to as "fool's gold"

Copper alloys